The port captaincies, also referred to as the harbormasters' offices, are a civilian administration of the Croatian Ministry of the Sea, Transport and Infrastructure with authority to control navigation in the internal and territorial waters of the Republic of Croatia, actions of search and rescue on sea, inspection of navigation safety, inspection of the maritime domain, registration and deletion of vessels as well as organizing a register of vessels. Additional tasks include establishing a vessels’ ability to navigate, tonnage measurement of ships, handing out of documents necessary for navigation, establishing the level of proficiency in case of professionals employed in the maritime transport etc.

There are eight port captaincy offices in Croatia: in Pula, Rijeka, Senj, Zadar, Šibenik, Split, Ploče and Dubrovnik.

Boats

See also
 Croatian Coast Guard

References

External links

 Ministry of Sea, Transport and Infrastructure

Water transport in Croatia
Croatia